Mark Julian  Loram (born 13 August 1967) is an English former footballer who played for Exeter City, Torquay United and Stockport County.

References

1967 births
Living people
English footballers
Association football midfielders
English Football League players
People from Paignton
Torquay United F.C. players
Queens Park Rangers F.C. players
Stockport County F.C. players
Exeter City F.C. players
Yate Town F.C. players
Minehead A.F.C. players
Elmore F.C. players